The Rajah spiny rat (Maxomys rajah) also known as the brown spiny rat is endemic to Thailand and Malaysia, Sumatra, Borneo, and adjacent islands (Payne et al., 1985).

Distribution and ecology
Corbet and Hill (1992) mention that Maxomys rats are often the most common rodent in the Southeast Asian tropical forest, from most of the Malay Archipelago to Sulawesi, Palawan and Borneo. This species can be found in primary forest and logged-over forest. According to Payne et al. (1985) this species lives in primary or secondary forest and tends to favour sandy and lowland sites. This terrestrial species is mostly active on the ground but occasionally climbs into the upper canopy. Its tend to live separately from other rats.

M.rajah is a common species but Yasuda et al. (2000) reported that very little is known about the ecological features of Maxomys rats.

Morphology
M. rajah is medium in size where the upperparts are brown, darker in the midline, with numerous stiff gray-brown spines. The underparts are white with many short, white spines, and usually with a dark brown streak along the middle in adults, but never with an orange throat patch. The white color of the underparts extend down in a narrow line to the feet. Above the tail is brown, pale below and thinly haired. Usually, the range of the measurement of  M. rajah are HB 138.1-218, T 142-210, T/HB = 102.9-109.3%, HF 33.8-43, E 21.9-22.3, Wt 71-218 g, D 1003/1003=16, M 2+2=8. Skull: gl 40.9-48.6, iob 6.6-7.4, mt 6.9-8.1. The immature Red Spiny Rats, M. surifer is similar M. rajah and quite difficult to distinguish. (Payne et al., 1985).

References

 Corbet, G.B and Hill, J.E.(1992). The mammals on the Indomalayan region: a systematic review. 	Natural History Museum Publications and Oxford University Press.
 Payne, J., Francis, C.M. and Phillipps, K. (1985). Field guide to mammals of Borneo. The Sabah 	Society with World Wildlife Fund Malaysia.
 Yasuda, M., Miura, S. and Hussein, N.A. (2000). Evidence for food hoarding behavior in terrestrial rodents in Pasoh forest reserve, a Malaysian lowland rain forest. Journal of 	Tropical forest Science.
 Shadbolt, A. B and Ragai, R. (2010) Effects of habitat fragmentation on the movement patterns and dispersal ability of the brown spiny rat (Maxomys rajah) in the planted forest zone of Sarawak, Eastern Malaysia. Biodiversity and Conservation 19(2): pp 531 – 541.

External links
Photos at ARKive.

Rats of Asia
Maxomys
Rodents of Indonesia
Rodents of Malaysia
Rodents of Thailand
Mammals of Borneo
Vulnerable fauna of Asia
Mammals described in 1894
Taxa named by Oldfield Thomas
Taxonomy articles created by Polbot